Preston in Lancashire, England has been associated with cotton since John Horrocks built his first spinning mill, the Yellow factory, in 1791. This was powered by a Bateman & Sherratt engine. Preston mills tended to have their own reservoirs. They spun cotton using hand mules and self-actors but normally also operated power looms in weaving sheds. Local firms such as Ainscow & Tomlinson and Grundy made mules for the mills. There were 60 mills operating in Preston in 1927.

The mills

Standing mills

Other mills

See also

List of mills owned by the Lancashire Cotton Corporation Limited

References

Bibliography

Preston
Preston
Buildings and structures in Preston
History of Preston
Mills in Preston